David John Newsom (born 5 October 1937) is an English former first-class cricketer and Royal Navy officer.

The son of Rear Admiral John Bertram Newsom, Newson was born at Plymouth. He was educated at Haileybury College, where he played cricket for the college cricket eleven. Newsom was an acting sub-lieutenant in the Royal Navy in May 1960, with full promotion to the rank in that same month. He was promoted to the rank of lieutenant in June 1962. He played first-class cricket for the Combined Services cricket team, making his debut against Cambridge University at Fenner's in 1960. He made a further appearance against Northamptonshire at Northampton in 1961. He scored 33 runs in these two matches, with a high score of 23.

References

External links

1937 births
Living people
Cricketers from Plymouth, Devon
People educated at Haileybury and Imperial Service College
Royal Navy officers
English cricketers
Combined Services cricketers